Rheinfelden is a town in the district of Lörrach in Baden-Württemberg, Germany. It is situated on the right bank of the Rhine, across from Rheinfelden, Switzerland, and 15 km east of Basel. The population is 32,919 as of 2020, making it the second most populated town of the district after Lörrach.

Geography
Rheinfelden is located on the Swiss-German border, between the High Rhine to the south and the Dinkelberg hills to the north in the district of Lörrach. It borders the Swiss town of the same name across the Rhine river, and the towns of Grenzach-Wyhlen, Inzlingen, Steinen, Maulburg, Schopfheim, Schwörstadt, and Wehr in Germany.

Communities
Rheinfelden consists of a relatively young town core (founded in the late 19th century), two formerly independent villages (Nollingen and Warmbach), and seven villages which were incorporated into the town between 1972 and 1975. These are:
Degerfelden (alem. Degerfälde).
Minseln (alem. Meisele).
Herten (alem. Herte).
Nordschwaben (alem. Nordschwoobe).
Adelhausen (alem. Adelhuuse).
Eichsel (alem. Eiggsle)
Karsau (alem. Charsau) and its community of Beuggen (alem. Büügge).

Apart from the town core, the villages forming Rheinfelden date from the early Middle Ages. Partly because of this, a teasing animosity exists between the villages with their longer history and traditions, and the industrial town core with its diverse population of recent origin.

Twin towns – sister cities

Rheinfelden (Baden) is twinned with:
 Fécamp, France
 Mouscron, Belgium
 Neumarkt, Italy
 Vale of Glamorgan, Wales

Notable people
Hans Blum (1841–1910), journalist and writer, lived in Rheinfelden from 1865
Jürgen Untermann (1928–2013), linguist, indoeuropeanist and epigraphist
Anne-Sophie Mutter (born 1963), violinist
Jochen Böhler (born 1969), historian, specializing in the military history of World War II
Dietmar Dath (born 1970), author, journalist and translator
Monique Riesterer (born 1971), weightlifter
Lars Halter (born 1973), German-American journalist
Ruwen Faller (born 1980), 400 metre sprinter
Raoul Petretta (born 1997), Italian footballer

References

Twin cities
Lörrach (district)
Germany–Switzerland border crossings
Divided cities
Baden